The Chatkal is a river of Jalal-Abad Region, Kyrgyzstan and Tashkent Region in Uzbekistan. It is the left source river of the Chirchiq in the Syr Darya basin. In its upper course it is called Karakulja.

It originates at the point where Chatkal Range adjoins Talas Ala-Too Range. Its largest tributaries are the Aksuu, Kokuybel, Avletim, Ters and Nayza (Oqbuloq) from the left, and the Karakysmak, Beshterek, Chandalash and Köksuu from the right.

References

External links
Rivers and lakes of Kyrgyzstan
Running the Chatkal River in Turkestan

Rivers of Uzbekistan
Rivers of Kyrgyzstan
Tashkent Region
International rivers of Asia